The Lonesomest Lonesome is a studio album by country music artist Ray Price. It was released in 1972 by Columbia Records (catalog no. KC-31546).

The album debuted on Billboard magazine's country album chart on August 5, 1972, peaked at No. 3, and remained on the chart for a total of 16 weeks. It included the No. 2 hit single, "The Lonesomest Lonesome".

AllMusic gave the album two-and-a-half stars.

Track listing
Side A
 "The Lonesomest Lonesome"
 "But I Was Lying"
 "One Night to Remember"
 "Just the Other Side of Nowhere"
 "Empty Chairs"
 "Time"

Side B
 "That's What Leaving's About"
 "Wake Up Yesterday"
 "Over"
 "This House"
 "Oh, Lonesome Me"

References

1972 albums
Ray Price (musician) albums
Columbia Records albums